The Autovía A-48 is a highway in Andalucia, Spain.

It follows the route of the N-340 around the southern tip of Spain. It is currently under construction, and upon completion it will serve as a continuation of the Autovía A-7 from Algeciras, linking it to Cadiz (junction with Autopista AP-4 towards Madrid, Seville, and the border with Portugal).

The highway replaced the historic trail "La Trocha".

References

See also
N-340 road (Spain)

A-48
A-48